BD+60°2522 is a bright O-type star that has produced the Bubble Nebula (NGC 7635) with its stellar wind. The exact classification of the star is uncertain, with a number of spectral peculiarities and inconsistencies between the appearance of the star itself and the effects on the nearby nebulosity, but it is undoubtedly a highly luminous hot massive star. It is a member of the Cassiopeia OB2 stellar association in the Perseus Arm of the galaxy at about 8,500 light-years' distance.

Although BD+60°2522 is around two million years old, the surrounding nebula is apparently only about 40,000 years old. The bubble is expected to be formed as a shock front where the stellar wind meets interstellar material at supersonic speeds. The wind from BD+60°2522 is travelling outwards at 1,800–2,500 km/s, causing the star to lose over a millionth of the mass of the Sun every year.

References

Cassiopeia (constellation)
Emission-line stars
BD+60 2522
O-type stars
J23204452+6111404
IRAS catalogue objects